Neville Stanton (born May 5, 1975) is a Guyanese footballer who has played for Fruta Conquerors and Guyana Defence Force as a defender. He has been capped by Guyana at international level.

References

Living people
Guyanese footballers
Guyana international footballers
Association football defenders
1975 births
Sportspeople from Georgetown, Guyana
Fruta Conquerors FC players
Guyana Defence Force FC players